The following is a list of parks and gardens in Karachi, Sindh, Pakistan. Many of them are maintained by the Karachi Metropolitan Corporation.

Public parks
 5B Park (Phool Bagh), North Nazimabad Town
Afza Altaf Park
Agha Khan Park
Allah Rakha Park
Aladin Park 
Amina Park  
Amir Khusro, Clifton Cantonment 
Anu Bhai Park
Aram Bagh Saddar Town
Askari Amusement Park Gulshan-e-Iqbal Town
Aunty Park, Clifton Cantonment 
Aziz Bhatti Park Gulshan-e-Iqbal Town
 Baara Dari Park, North Nazimabad Town
 Babul Islam Play Ground New Karachi Town 
Bagh Ibne Qasim Clifton Cantonment 
Baloch Park Saddar Town
Baradari Old Polo Ground
Bedhwar Library, Park Jamshed Town
Beach View Park, Clifton Cantonment 
Boat Basin Park, Clifton Cantonment 
Botanical Garden, Gulshan-e-Iqbal Town
Bukhari Shah Park Kharadar
Cantonment Park Malir Cantonment
 Central Park, Taiser Town
 Central Park, Sector T, Gulshan-e-Maymar, Taiser Town
Chandni Chowk Park
 Chhatree ( Umbrella ) Park, Taiser Town
 Corniche Park Clifton Cantonment 
Dehli Park, Lyari Town
Dolphin Beach Park, Clifton Cantonment  
 F Block Playground, North Nazimabad Town
Fatima Zehra Park
Gabol Park Lyari Town
Go AishGulshan-e-Iqbal Town
Hasa Singh Park, Jamshed Town
Hasrat Mohani Model Park 
Hill Park, Jamshed Town
 Ibn-e-Insha Park, North Nazimabad Town
Jahangir ParkSaddar Town
 Jam 11, Football Ground, Malir Town
Jama Masjid Park, Lyari Town
Jamaluddin Afghani Park
Johar Park
Kamal Park Gulshan-e-Iqbal Town
Kashmir Park, Jamshed Town
Kernal Park, Jamshed Town
Khayyal Das ParkSaddar Town
Khori Garden, Lyari Town
Khaja Nazimuddin Family Park
 Khatoon Park, Orangi Town
 Kidney Hill Park, Gulshan Town
Kite Park
Kutchi Memon Park
 Lala Gul Park 11/A, New Karachi Town
Liaquat Park  
 Lucknow Chhota Park Korangi Town
 Lucknow Bara Park, Korangi Town
Maulana Mohammad Ali Jauhar Park
 Metroville SITE Town Park, Orangi Town
Mir Usman Park, Lyari Town
Mohammadi Park
Moulvi Usman Park, Lyari Town
Mudassir Park Gulshan-e-Iqbal Town
Mujahid Shaheed Model Park Korangi Town
 Naveen Bhai Ground Lyari Town
 New International Stadium, Baldia Town 
Nisar Shaheed Park, Clifton Cantonment 
Nishtar Park Jamshed Town
 Park, Taiser Town
 Park Orangi Town, Orangi Town
Parsi Colony Park Jamshed Town
 Partab Singh Park, Saddar Town 
 Playground 5A/3 New Karachi Town 
Professor Rafiq Chohan Park, Saddar Town 
Sabri Park 
Sohrab Katrak Park Jamshed Town
The Forum Clifton Cantonment Board ParkClifton Cantonment
Tikon Park Clifton Cantonment 
Usmania Family Park Gulshan-e-Iqbal Town
Zamzama Park, Clifton Cantonment
Alakhwan Park, New Karachi Town

National parks

National Park SITE Town
Kirthar National Park

Private parks
 Dreamworld Resort, Super Highway
 Jaan Farmhouse
 Jabees Playland, Clifton
 Shamsi farmhouse Malir Cantonment
 Sindbad, Rashid Minhas Road

Gardens
 Bagh Ibne Qasim
 Bagh-e-Jinnah, Karachi
 Jheel Park, Jamshed Town
 Karachi Zoological Gardens, Garden Road
 Safari Park Gulshan-e-Iqbal Town
 Talimi Bagh

Playgrounds

 CAA Club Jogging Track Faisal Cantonment
 Al Jafar Playground 
 Bangalore Town Ground Gulshan-e-Iqbal Town
 F Block Playground North Nazimabad Town
 Fateh Bagh North Nazimabad Town
 Jinnah Ground Gulberg Town
 KGA Grounds Jamshed Town
 Karachi Parsi Institute Jamshed Town
 Khajji Ground 
 Kokan Ground Gulshan-e-Iqbal Town
 Pakistan Association for Deaf (pad) Ground
 Railway Ground
 National Bank of Pakistan Sports Complex
 Shaheen Ground
 Sharfabad Cricket Ground Gulshan-e-Iqbal Town
 Yousuf Suleman Mulai Ground Gulshan-e-Iqbal Town
 Zahid Ground Gulbarg Town
Goal football/cricket ground model colony

Golf and Country clubs

 Acacia Country and Golf Club Faisal Cantonment
 Defence Authority Country and Golf Club Clifton Cantonment
 Karachi Golf Club  Faisal Cantonment 
 Gulmohar Golf Club Malir Cantonment
 Arabian Sea Country Club Bin Qasim Town

See also
 List of parks and gardens in Pakistan
 List of parks and gardens in Lahore
List of urban parks by size

External links
 Parks In Karachi - CDGK
 Garden Landscaping In Karachi
 Ibad orders master plan for each park - DAWN.com
  Urban Landscape - Aamir Kanji Gardens Building

 
Gardens in Pakistan
Parks
Karachi
Karachi
Environment of Karachi
Tourist attractions in Karachi